Vukan's Gospel (  Vukanovo jevanđelje) is a 13th-century Serbian illuminated manuscript (Gospel Book) in Serbian recension of Church Slavonic. It is one of the oldest preserved Serbian medieval books, with more than 189 pages.

It was produced in Ras, which was the capital of the medieval Principality of Serbia, by the monk Simeon for Prince Vukan, the son of King Stefan Nemanja. It is the oldest aprakos written in Rascian.
Miniatures in Vukan's Gospel from the beginning of the 13th century, are representative of the Raška miniature style. They were executed in the spirit of the late Comnenus art, characterized by graphic interpretations. The old monk Symeon left a long note saying that the manuscript had been made for the Great Zupan of the city of Ras, Vukan Nemanjić. It is quite possible that Simeon was the author of the miniatures.

See also
Medieval Serbian literature

References

Vukan Gospel. Complete Aprakos. About 1200. Serbian version. One of scribes: Monk Simeon

Church Slavonic manuscripts
Medieval documents of Serbia
Serbian literature
Serbian manuscripts
Gospel Books
13th-century biblical manuscripts
13th-century illuminated manuscripts
Cyrillic manuscripts
Cyrillo-Methodian studies